In chess, the exchange is a situation in which one player exchanges a  (i.e. a bishop or knight) for a rook.  The side which wins the rook is said to have won the exchange, while the other player has lost the exchange, since the rook is usually more valuable. Alternatively, the side having a rook for a minor piece is said to be up the exchange, and the other player is down the exchange. The opposing captures often happen on consecutive moves, although this is not strictly necessary.  It is generally detrimental to lose the exchange, although occasionally one may find reason to purposely do so; the result is an exchange sacrifice (see below). The minor exchange is an uncommon term for the exchange of a bishop and knight.

Value of the exchange

The value of the exchange (i.e. the difference between a rook and a minor piece) has been considered for decades. Siegbert Tarrasch put its value as 1½ pawns in the endgame, but not for the opening or the first part of the middlegame. That is widely accepted today, but Jacob Sarratt, Howard Staunton, and José Capablanca felt that the exchange was worth two pawns. Tigran Petrosian thought that one pawn was the right value. Wilhelm Steinitz said that a rook is slightly better than a knight and two pawns but slightly worse than a bishop and two pawns. Cecil Purdy said that the value depends on the total number of pawns on the board. The reason is that when there are many pawns, the rooks will have limited mobility because there will not be open . The exchange is barely worth 1½ points when there are 14 or more pawns on the board. Only when there are ten or fewer pawns may the exchange be worth 2 points . Purdy gave the value as 1½ points in the opening and increasing to 2 points in the endgame. In the middlegame the value would be closer to 1½ than to 2. Edmar Mednis gave the value as 1½ in the endgame. Max Euwe put the value at 1½ in the middlegame and said that two pawns are more than sufficient compensation for the exchange. Hans Berliner puts the difference between a rook and knight as 1.9 pawns and the difference between a rook and a bishop as 1.77 pawns. In practice, one pawn may be sufficient compensation for the loss of the exchange, whereas two pawns almost always is.

In the endgame
In the middlegame, the advantage of an exchange is usually enough to win the game if the side with the rook has one or more pawns.  In an endgame without pawns, the advantage of the exchange is normally not enough to win (see pawnless chess endgame).  The most common exceptions when there are no pawns are (1) a rook versus a bishop in which the defending king is trapped in a corner of the same color as his bishop, (2) a knight separated from its king that may be cornered and lost, and (3) the king and knight are poorly placed.

In the endgame of a rook and a pawn versus a knight and a pawn, if the pawns are passed the rook is much stronger and should win.  If the pawns are not passed, the side with knight has good drawing chances if its pieces are well-placed.

In the endgame of a rook and a pawn versus a bishop and pawn, if the pawns are on the same file, the bishop has good chances to draw if the pawns are blocked and the opposing pawn is on a square the bishop can attack; otherwise the rook usually wins.  If the pawns are passed the rook normally wins.  If the pawns are not passed and are on adjacent files, it is difficult to assess but the bishop may be able to draw.

In an endgame with more pawns on the board (i.e. a rook and pawns versus a minor piece with the same number of pawns) the rook usually wins.  This position is typical.  The superior side should remember these things:
 the main idea is to get the king through to capture opposing pawns
 force as many opposing pawns as possible onto the same color square as the bishop
 some pawn exchanges may be necessary to open , but keep pawns on both sides of the board
 try to keep the position unbalanced. A passed pawn almost immediately becomes a winning advantage.

If the minor piece has an extra pawn (i.e. one pawn for the exchange), the rook should win, but with difficulty.  If the minor piece has two extra pawns, the endgame should be a draw.

The exchange sacrifice 
An exchange sacrifice occurs when one player gives up a rook for a minor piece. It is often used to destroy the enemy pawn structure (as in several variations of the Sicilian Defence where Black  a knight on c3 with a rook), to establish a minor piece on a strong square (often threatening the enemy king), to improve one's own pawn structure (creating, for example, connected passed pawns such as in A Yurgis vs. Botvinnik, 1931), or to gain time for development.  The exchange sacrifice contrasts with other sacrifices in that during the early-middle to middle game the board is sufficiently crowded to where the rook is not as effective as an active knight or a good bishop; this is why such exchange sacrifices happen usually from moves 20 to 30, and rarely occur in the later moves. When they do occur in the endgame, it is usually to create and promote a passed pawn.  Subsequently, the relative importance of the pieces might be different from the standardized Chess piece relative value system and takes advantage of the fluctuating values of the pieces during the progression of the game.  The sacrifice might also be used to increase the influence of one's own minor pieces by eliminating opposition from their counterparts (such as in the Petrosian versus Spassky game below, where even a double exchange sacrifice was successful).  A common example of this idea is the elimination an opponent's bishop, with the expectation that in doing so one's own bishop will increase in power from being unopposed on the color squares in which it resides.  There is often more dynamic play and positional considerations such as pawn structure or piece placement compared to sacrifices due to a mating attack or a pawn sacrifice to gain the initiative.  Sometimes the exchange can be sacrificed purely on long term positional objectives, as frequently demonstrated by former world champion Tigran Petrosian.

Sokolov vs. Kramnik

In this 2004 game between Ivan Sokolov and World Champion Vladimir Kramnik, White gave up the exchange for a pawn to create two strong connected passed pawns.  The game continued:
33. Rxc7 Qxc7
34. Rxf6 Rxf6
35. Qxf6 Rf8
and White won on move 41.

Reshevsky vs. Petrosian

Tigran Petrosian, the World Champion from 1963–1969, was well known for his especially creative use of this device. He once responded (only half jokingly), when asked what was his favourite piece, as saying "The rook, because I can sacrifice it for minor pieces!" In the game Reshevsky versus Petrosian at the 1953 Candidates Tournament in Zurich, he sacrificed the exchange on move 25, only for his opponent to sacrifice it in return on move 30. This game is perhaps the most famous and most frequently taught example of the exchange sacrifice.

There are no open  in this position for the rooks to exploit. Black sacrificed the exchange with 
 25... Re6
With the rook not on e7, the black knight will be able to get to a strong outpost on d5.  From there the knight will be attacking the pawn on c3, and if the white bishop on b2 does not move to d2, it will be of little use.  In addition, it will be practically impossible to break Black's defense on the white squares.  The next few moves were:
 26. a4 Ne7!
 27. Bxe6 fxe6
 28. Qf1! Nd5
 29. Rf3 Bd3
 30. Rxd3 cxd3
The game was drawn on move 41.

Petrosian vs. Spassky

In the tenth game from the 1966 World Chess Championship between defending champion Tigran Petrosian and challenger Boris Spassky contained two exchange sacrifices by White.  Black had just moved 
20... Bh3?! (first diagram)
White responded with an exchange sacrifice:
21. Ne3!
White had no choice: 21.Rf2 Rxf4 22.Rxf4 Qg5+, etc.  The game continued:
21... Bxf1 22. Rxf1 Ng6 23. Bg4! Nxf4?! (second diagram)

And now a second exchange sacrifice:
24. Rxf4! Rxf4
Black is helpless, despite being two exchanges ahead.  White won back an exchange on move 29.  On move 30 White forced the win of the other rook and the exchange of queens.  Black resigned because the position was a winning endgame for White (two knights and five pawns versus one knight and four pawns).  Petrosian won the match by one game to retain his title.

Kasparov vs. Shirov

In a 1994 game between World Champion Garry Kasparov and Alexei Shirov, White sacrificed a pure exchange (rook for a bishop) with the move 17. Rxb7!!. As compensation for the sacrifice, Black became weak on the white squares, which were dominated by White's bishop. During the game, many spectating grandmasters were sceptical whether White's compensation was enough. Black returned the exchange on move 28, making the  equal, but White had a strong initiative. Black missed a better 28th move after which White could have forced a draw, but would have had no clear advantage. White won the game on move 38.

Minor exchange
The minor exchange is the trade of the opponent's bishop for the player's knight (or, more recently, the stronger  for the weaker). Bobby Fischer used the term, but it is rarely used.

In most chess positions, a bishop is worth slightly more than a knight because of its longer range of movement. As a chess game progresses, pawns tend to get traded, removing support points from the knight and opening up lines for the bishop. This generally leads to the bishop's advantage increasing over time.

Traditional chess theory espoused by masters such as Wilhelm Steinitz and Siegbert Tarrasch puts more value on the bishop than the knight.  In contrast, the hypermodern school favored the knight over the bishop.  Modern theory is that it depends on the position, but that there are more positions where the bishop is better than where the knight is better.

Occasions when a knight can be worth more than a bishop are frequent, so this exchange is not necessarily made at every opportunity to do so.

Many of the Classicists of the late nineteenth and early twentieth century claimed that two bishops versus rook and knight were equivalent. Today, the view is that a pair of bishops shouldn't be underestimated, but the rook and knight are still superior. A pair of active bishops is frequently adequate compensation for a pawn - or even the exchange in a middlegame position. Adding the better cooperation of the rook with the bishops, many Soviet theoreticians believed that, in active positions, rook and two bishops outperform two rooks and a knight. The modern consensus is that the side with the two bishops need at least a pawn when facing rook and knight, even then the side with the two bishops is underdog. William Steinitz reckoned that often two bishops and two pawns are superior against rook and knight. 

A rook and bishop usually work better together than a rook and knight in the endgame. José Raúl Capablanca stated that a queen and knight work better together than a queen and bishop in the endgame. Watson states that positions in this endgame in general "are very volatile, and often the winning side is simply the one who starts out being able to win material or launch an attack on the opposing king". Glenn Flear agrees with that assessment for endgames. He could not find an endgame by Capablanca that supported his statement. The statistics for queen and bishop versus queen and knight endgames are about even. Most decisive games were won because of a significant advantage from the middlegame and only a limited number of positions show an inherent superiority for one over the other.

See also
 Chess piece relative value
 Chess strategy
 Chess tactics
 Chess theory
 Exchange (chess)

References

Bibliography
 

 

 
 

 

 
  Page 110-24 is about the exchange

Further reading
 Peter Wells, "The Exchange Sacrifice Revisited – Part 1", ChessBase Magazine, #111, April 2006, pp. 18–24.

Chess terminology
Chess strategy
Chess theory